Seda Noorlander (born 22 May 1974) is a former tennis player from the Netherlands who turned professional in 1993. She reached the final of the 2001 Tashkent Open in singles, losing to Bianka Lamade. She won one doubles titles with Christina Papadáki. Her career-high ranking is No. 80 in the world, which she achieved on 13 December 1999. Her best Grand Slam performance is reaching the third round of Wimbledon in 1999.

WTA career finals

Singles: 1 (runner-up)

Doubles: 3 (1 title, 2 runner-ups)

ITF finals

Singles: 13 (3–10)

Doubles: 32 (22–10)

External links
 
 
 

1974 births
Living people
Dutch female tennis players
Sportspeople from The Hague